Thomas Vavasour was a physician.

Thomas Vavasour may also refer to:
Thomas Vavasour (knight marshal) (1560–1620), MP
Thomas Vavasour (died before 1636), of the Vavasour baronets